Robert Shannon King, OBE (22 March 1920 – 30 June 1991) was an Australian politician. Born in Warracknabeal, Victoria, he attended Carey Grammar School in Melbourne before serving in the military 1940–45. He returned to Warracknabeal as a farmer and grazier, and became an official of the Victorian Country Party. In 1958, he was elected to the Australian House of Representatives as the Country Party member for Wimmera. On 5 October 1971 he was appointed Assistant Minister assisting the Minister for Primary Industry, holding that this position until the McMahon Government's defeat on 5 December 1972.

King's seat of Wimmera was abolished in 1977, and he retired from parliament. However his political activity continued, and he was campaign manager for Victorian State MP Bill McGrath in the 1979, 1982, 1985 and 1988 State elections. King died in 1991.

References

National Party of Australia members of the Parliament of Australia
Members of the Australian House of Representatives for Wimmera
Members of the Australian House of Representatives
Australian Officers of the Order of the British Empire
People educated at Carey Baptist Grammar School
1920 births
1991 deaths
20th-century Australian politicians
People from Warracknabeal